Richard Mark Bateman (born 27 May 1958) is a British botanist and paleobotanist. He was awarded the Bicentenary Medal of the Linnean Society in 1994. He was awarded a DSc from University of London in 2001 for his work on plant phylogenetics and evolution, palaeobotany and palaeoenvironments. 

Richard Bateman gained a BSc in Geology in 1981 from Birkbeck, University of London and earned a doctorate in Paleobiology at University of London in 1985. From 1988-1991 he was in the Department of Paleobiology at the Smithsonian Institution. From 1991-1994 he was a Senior Postdoctoral Research Fellow at University of Oxford. He was Principal Scientific Officer at Royal Botanic Garden Edinburgh from 1994-1996, then Head of Science at Royal Botanic Garden Edinburgh from 1996-1999. He served as Keeper of Botany (i.e. Head of the Botany Department) at the Natural History Museum from 1999-2004, and was an Individual Merit researcher there from 2004-2006. He was Head of Policy for Biosciences Federation from 2006-2007. He is currently an Honorary Research Fellow at Royal Botanic Gardens Kew.

He has over 300 publications which extend from evolutionary-developmental genetics and evolutionary theory through speciation and phylogenetics of orchids to anatomical palaeobotany. 

He is married to the Botanist Paula Rudall.

References

 'BATEMAN, Richard Mark', Who's Who 2011, A & C Black, 2011; online edn, Oxford University Press, Dec 2010 ; online edn, Oct 2010 accessed 17 July 2011
 Richard Bateman, ResearchGate accessed Mar 2023

1958 births
Living people
British botanists
Place of birth missing (living people)